Doncaster Mansion House is a Grade I listed building in Doncaster, South Yorkshire, England.  It is owned and managed by Doncaster Council, and the venue is used for civic and private functions, including tours, afternoon teas, wedding services, and official receptions.

The Mansion House stands on the site of the Carmelite Friary, which had been established in Doncaster in 1350 and remained until its dissolution on 13 November 1538, after which the buildings were destroyed. During the 18th century, Doncaster's position on the Great North Road brought wealth to the town.  The town's corporation was frequently called on to host entertainments, initially at the mayor's house or the Angel or Three Cranes inns.  In 1719, they took a lease on a house in the High Street for holding feasts, but let this lapse around 1727.  They bought a site on the High Street in 1738, with the intention of building a permanent base for entertaining, but little construction took place for several years.  In 1746, James Paine was appointed as architect in 1746.  Although young, Paine had already worked on Nostell Priory and had designed Heath House, both near Wakefield.

Mansion Houses had already been constructed in Newcastle upon Tyne (now demolished), York and London.  Whereas these other buildings contained both formal reception rooms and living quarters for the mayor, Doncaster's differed in being designed purely for entertainment, although some later mayors used space in the building as accommodation.

Paine planned a building along the now established designs of Assembly Rooms.  It was completed in 1748 and officially opened in 1749, the construction having cost £8,000.  Paine was immediately offered more local work, starting with alterations to Cusworth Hall.  He published his designs for the Mansion House in 1751.  This work showed the building flanked by two other structures, marked as houses for the town clerk and recorder, but these were never part of the commission and were not built.

William Lindley extended the building between 1801 and 1806, adding an attic storey, a rear banqueting hall and rear landing.

Friends of Doncaster Mansion House 
The charity Friends of Doncaster Mansion House (Registered Charity Number 1171398) was formed in January 2015 “to support Doncaster Council to conserve, restore, research, interpret and display the Mansion House and its contents for the benefit for all sections of the community and for future generation to open up the Mansion House to the public”.

In 2017, the Friends of Doncaster Mansion House led on the James Paine Festival, the celebrations of the 300th anniversary of the birth of James Paine, architect of the Doncaster Mansion House.

See also
Grade I listed buildings in South Yorkshire
Listed buildings in Doncaster (Town Ward)

References

External links 

Doncaster Mansion House official website

Houses completed in 1748
Buildings and structures in Doncaster
Grade I listed buildings in South Yorkshire
Mayors' mansions in the United Kingdom